Celebrity Head Chef is the second series of TV3's cookery series, Head Chef. The series features Conrad Gallagher, the youngest chef ever to win a Michelin Star and stars Wagner Fiuza-Carrilho from The X Factor; Mary Burke, the mammy from Crystal Swing; Adele King (Twink); Geraldine from The Apprentice; Michael Hayes, the presenter from How Low Can You Go?; and former model Kohlin Harris.

Contestants 

As there are no eliminations in the show, the series will begin and end with 6 contestants. At the conclusion of the final episode, Conrad will choose the winner.

Wagner Carrilho 

Wagner Carrilho was an X Factor contestant known for his charismatic performances and his unique personality. After being rejected in the audition round, Wagner was called back into the competition as Louis Walsh's Wild card. He was eliminated in the 8th week of the X Factor competition after performing in the final showdown with Irish singer Mary Byrne.

Mary Burke 

Mary Burke is the mother and keyboardist of the popular family singing group, Crystal Swing. The group has appeared on The Late Late on RTÉ and The Ellen DeGeneres Show in America.

Michael Hayes 

Michael Hayes was the presenter from How Low Can You Go? on RTÉ Two. He is also the presenter of Animal A & E on TV3.

Geraldine O'Callaghan 

Geraldine O’Callaghan was a semi-finalist on The Apprentice on TV3.She was eliminated in the 12th week of the Apprentice competition.

Kohlin Harris 

Kohlin Harris was Ireland's first male supermodel, modelling for Calvin Klein and Versace who was scouted in Dublin aged 16.

Adele King 

Adele King is an entertainer better known as Twink formerly of a group called Maxi, Dick and Twink. She has also been described as Ireland's panto queen. She is also respected in the sugar craft world.

References 

Irish cooking television series